Olga Vladimirovna Romasko (born 18 April 1968 in Borodino, Krasnoyarsk Krai) is a former Russian biathlete. She began with biathlon in 1993. Both in 1996 and 1997, she became world champion in the 7.5 km sprint event. Romasko also won a bronze medal both in the pursuit and on the relay in 1997. At the 1998 Winter Olympics in Nagano, she won a silver medal with the Russian relay team. Over the course of her career she had four individual world cup victories.

References
 
 

1968 births
Living people
People from Krasnoyarsk Krai
Russian female biathletes
Olympic biathletes of Russia
Olympic silver medalists for Russia
Biathletes at the 1998 Winter Olympics
Olympic medalists in biathlon
Biathlon World Championships medalists
Medalists at the 1998 Winter Olympics
Sportspeople from Krasnoyarsk Krai